The Van Siclen Avenue station is a skip-stop station on the BMT Jamaica Line of the New York City Subway. Located at the intersection of Fulton Street and Van Siclen Avenue in Brooklyn, it is served by the Z train during rush hours in the peak direction, and by the J train other times.

History 

The station opened on December 3, 1885 as part of a one station extension of the Lexington Avenue Line from Alabama Avenue. This station was the eastern terminus of the line until May 30, 1893 when it was extended to Cypress Hills. 

This station was closed from March 25 to August 6, 2006 in order to be rehabilitated. As part of the rehabilitation project, the stairs were rehabilitated, the floors were renewed, major structural repairs were made, new canopies were installed, the area around the station booth was reconfigured, the platform edge strips were replaced, walls were replaced, and a high-quality public address system was installed. The rehabilitation project cost $8.52 million.

Station layout

This elevated station has two tracks and one island platform. The canopy is short and has a squared off, flat roof-line.

The artwork here, THE VIEW FROM HERE by Barbara Ellmann, was installed in 2007. This artwork is supposed to be evocative of structures in the surrounding area.

Exit
The station's only entrance and exit is a center mezzanine under the tracks with wooden floors and walls. This mezzanine is to the geographic south of the northbound track. Outside of fare control, two stairs go to southwest and southeast corners of Fulton Street and Van Siclen Avenue.

References

External links 
 
 
 Station Reporter — J Train
 The Subway Nut — Van Siclen Avenue Pictures
 MTA's Arts For Transit — Van Siclen Avenue (BMT Jamaica Line)
 Van Siclen Avenue entrance from Google Maps Street View
 Platform from Google Maps Street View
 The View From Here, nycsubway.org

BMT Jamaica Line stations
1885 establishments in New York (state)
New York City Subway stations in Brooklyn
Railway stations in the United States opened in 1885
East New York, Brooklyn